Matúš Rusnák (born 19 December 1999) is a Slovak professional footballer who currently plays for Fortuna Liga club MŠK Žilina as a midfielder.

Club career

MŠK Žilina
Rusnák made his Fortuna Liga debut for Žilina at OMS Arena against Senica on 8 August 2020. He came on in the 76th minute to replace Dávid Ďuriš with Žilina already two up following goals by Ďuriš and Jakub Paur. While on pitch, he witnessed two further goals by Vahan Bichakhchyan, cementing Žilina's 0:4 win in the first round fixture. By the end of the year, he had appeared in all 18 season's league fixtures of Žilina.

International career
Rusnák was first recognised as an alternate broader squad member for the senior Slovak national team by Štefan Tarkovič on 28 September 2021 ahead of two 2022 FIFA World Cup qualifiers against Russia and Croatia. When Štefan Tarkovič was replaced by Francesco Calzona in the summer of 2022, Rusnák immediately got into the shortlisted 27-man squad although he did not make an appearance in the two fixtures. In November, he also penetrated the 27-man squad although he was initially listed as an alternate, but following Michal Tomič's unavailability he was returned to the team. For December prospective national players' training camp, Rusnák was only listed as an alternate once again.

References

External links
 MŠK Žilina official club profile 
 
 Futbalnet profile 
 

1999 births
Living people
People from Levice
Sportspeople from the Nitra Region
Slovak footballers
Association football midfielders
MŠK Žilina players
2. Liga (Slovakia) players
Slovak Super Liga players